Louella E. Cable (1900–1986) was an American ichthyologist.

Biography
Louella E. Cable was born in Chamberlain, South Dakota on July 5, 1900.  She received a teacher's certificate from Dakota Wesleyan University and B.A. (1926) and M.A. (1927) degrees from the University of South Dakota.

In 1927, the U.S. Bureau of Fisheries hired Cable to assist Samuel Frederick Hildebrand at its research station and lab in Beaufort, North Carolina.  Working as a scientific illustrator, Cable was the first woman professional biologist at the Bureau.  Cable's illustrations won praise in the scientific community and notoriety in the popular press.  In her lab in 1929–1930, Cable successfully cultured several fish through their larval stages, a ground-breaking accomplishment: prior to this time, for many species, their early life cycles were only known from capture of wild specimens.

In 1937, Cable turned her research attention to shad in South Carolina's Edisto River.  By 1941, she was studying the family of fishes in the Chesapeake Bay watershed, and in 1942 Cable was named chair of a multi-state committee dedicated to restoring the Bay's shad fisheries.  With Robert A. Nesbitt, in 1943 she presented her research to Select Committee on Conservation of Wildlife Resources of the House of Representatives.  Cable wrote a nationally syndicated article, "Delaware Shad Fishing Has Suffered Great Reduction," in August 1944, arguing for a 50 percent reduction in annual catch tonnage in order to restore the fishery.  Along with fellow Fish and Wildlife Service scientist Lucille Farrier Stickel, Cable was praised by Secretary of the Interior Harold L. Ickes in a press release, as well as in an October 1945 article on the wire services, "Women Scientists Helped Yanks Win the War."

In 1950, working from Ann Arbor, Michigan, Cable shifted her focus to the fisheries of the Great Lakes, studying ciscoes and the decline of lake trout.  She received a Ph.D. in Fisheries Biology from the University of Michigan in 1959.  From 1957 to 1964, she led the agency's fish hatchery in Northville, researching ciscoes and other freshwater whitefish species.  Cable retired in 1970 after 43 years of service.

A fish from the Galápagos Islands, Cable's goby, was named for Louella Cable by Isaac Ginsburg.  Cable called his attention to the fish's ventral fins, which are not united.  Cable was, for a time, one of two female members of the American Fisheries Society, along with Emmeline Moore.

Cable died on 25 May 1986.  She left her estate to the University of South Dakota to endow the Louella E. Cable Memorial Scholarship for zoology students.

Selected publications
 Appendix II to the Report of the U.S. Commissioner of Fisheries for 1928.  Document no. 1037.
 Document no. 1093.

References

Bibliography

External links
 Louella E. Cable at Find a Grave

1900 births
1986 deaths
American ichthyologists
University of South Dakota alumni
University of Michigan alumni
Women ichthyologists